Clanfield F.C. is an association football club in Clanfield, near Carterton, England.

It should not be confused with Clanfield (Hampshire) F.C. which plays in the Hampshire Premier League.

History
There is evidence that the club was formed in 1890 and played on a field near Chestlion Farm, before moving to a pitch in the mid twentieth century near Faringdon road. The club joined the North Berks Football League for the 1924–25 season, and finishing as winners of Division 2 (Faringdon) at their first attempt. They stayed in the North Berks league for another season and then left.

After winning the Witney and District League in 1966–67, the club joined the Hellenic Football League starting in Division one. Two seasons later they gained promotion to the Premier Division, as champions of division one. They then spent the next ten years in the Premier Division, during which time they made their debut in the FA Vase, finishing runners-up twice before being relegated back to Division one at the end of the 1979–80 season. However it just took them one season to gain promotion when they finished as Runners-up in Division one in the 1980–81 season.

At the end of the 1984–85 season the club finished bottom of the Premier division, and the club had to be reformed in April of that season, with a new official name of Clanfield (April 1985) Football Club. The reformed club took over from Clanfields place in the Hellenic league and started the 1985–86 season in Division one. The club has since then remained in Division one of the Hellenic league, being placed in Division one West when the league was restructured for the 2000–01 season.

During the course of the 2005––06 season floodlights were installed at the ground allowing the club access to the league's floodlight cup competition, further ground enhancements have seen new dug-outs and seats in the main stand.

The 2010–11 season saw the club make their debut in the FA Cup losing to Fareham Town in their first ever game in the extra preliminary qualification round. This season also saw the club finish a very creditable fourth place in Division One West, just three points from a second-place finish and subsequent promotion to the Premier Division. In the following seasons since they have finished 8th, 11th, 5th and in 2014–15 in 9th.

A series of further ground improvement works are currently ongoing and being undertaken by some very hard working volunteers, these include fencing and a concrete walkway around the ground. Dressing room improvements are in the pipeline too making the Radcot Road ground an even more attractive setting in this tiny West Oxfordshire village.

During the pre-season of 2015–16 the club hosted National Conference outfit Eastleigh at Radcot Road, with the professional side running out 4-0 winners. A good evening was enjoyed by all in attendance.

Season 2015–16 was one of transition in terms of the senior playing side as manager Peter Osborne started to focus more on youth development. The club has some very talented young players coming on the scene and this was reflected quite a bit in the results and eventual finish in the table of 3rd from the bottom. Hopefully these lads will push on and with others coming through a bright future lays ahead.

The summer of 2016 saw a few changes off the field as the club entered a period of transition. Long serving Chairman John Osborne stood down along with his wife Monica and long serving groundsman Geoff Collet retired.

Ground

Clanfield play their home games at Radcot Road, Clanfield, Oxfordshire, OX18 2ST

Honours

League honours
Hellenic Football League Premier Division :
 Runners-up (2): 1972–73, 1973–74
Hellenic Football League Division One:
 Winners (1): 1969–70
 Runners-up (1): 1980–81
North Berks Football League Division Two (Faringdon):
 Winners (1): 1924–25

Cup honours
Hellenic Football League Premier Division Cup:
 Winners (1): 1973–74
Hellenic Football League Premier Division Cup:
 Winners (1): 1985–86
Oxfordshire Junior Cup:
 Winners (1): 1932–33
Witney Senior Challenge Cup:
 Winners (1): 1932–33
Faringdon Memorial Cup:
 Runners-up (2): 2004–05, 2012–13

Records

Highest League Position: 2nd in Hellenic premier Division 1972–73, 1973–74
FA Cup best performance: Extra Preliminary qualifying round 2010–11, 2011–12
FA Vase best performance: Fourth round 1974–75
Highest Attendance: 197 v Kidlington – 26 August 2002

Former players
 Players that have played/managed in the football league or any foreign equivalent to this level (i.e. fully professional league).
 Players with full international caps.
Harry Bowl

Former coaches
 Managers/Coaches that have played/managed in the football league or any foreign equivalent to this level (i.e. fully professional league).
 Managers/Coaches with full international caps.

  John Shuker
  Pat Quartermain

References

External links
 Club Website
 WDYFL

Football clubs in Oxfordshire
Hellenic Football League
Association football clubs established in 1890
1890 establishments in England
Football clubs in England
Witney and District League
North Bucks & District Football League